Minuscule 863 (in the Gregory-Aland numbering), Θε301 (von Soden), is a 12th-century Greek minuscule manuscript of the New Testament on parchment. The manuscript has no complex context.

Description 

The codex contains the text of the four Gospels on 400 parchment leaves (size ), with a catena. It has some lacunae (John 18:10-21:25). The text is written in two columns per page, 41 lines per page.
The biblical text is surrounded by a catena. The commentary is of Theophylact's authorship.
It contains decorated head-pieces and decorated initial letters.

Text 
Kurt Aland did not place the Greek text of the codex in any Category.
It was not examined by the Claremont Profile Method.

History 

F. H. A. Scrivener dated the manuscript to the 12th or 13th century, C. R. Gregory dated it to the 13th century. Currently the manuscript is dated by the INTF to the 12th century. According to the colophon it was written in 1154.

The manuscript was added to the list of New Testament manuscripts by Scrivener (676e) and Gregory (863e). Gregory saw it in 1886. It was examined by Kirsopp Lake.

The manuscript once belonged to the Cardinal Antonio Carafa.

Currently the manuscript is housed at the Vatican Library (Gr. 1221), in Rome.

See also 

 List of New Testament minuscules
 Biblical manuscript
 Textual criticism
 Minuscule 862

References

Further reading

External links 
 

Greek New Testament minuscules
12th-century biblical manuscripts
Manuscripts of the Vatican Library